Fairhaven (formerly Rolph) is an unincorporated community and census-designated place (CDP) adjacent to Humboldt Bay in Humboldt County, California, United States.

In 1867, Hans Ditlev Bendixsen opened a ship building yard in Fairhaven. Bendixsen built many vessels for the lumber trade. Bendixsen constructed 92 sailing vessels between 1869 and 1901, including 35 three-masters. These included the C.A. Thayer  which is now preserved at the San Francisco Maritime National Historical Park.

The Rolph post office operated from 1918 to 1921. That name was for Governor James Rolph of California. The name "Fairhaven" was taken from Fair Haven, a neighborhood in New Haven, Connecticut.

Demographics

References

Census-designated places in Humboldt County, California
Census-designated places in California
Populated coastal places in California